Graham Usher (born 14 June 1973) is an English professional darts player who plays in Professional Darts Corporation events.

Career
In 2009, Usher qualified for the 2009 UK Open as the Holsten Pils qualifier in Batley; he lost 3–6 to Glen Durrant in the first round.

In 2014, he took part in Grand Slam Wild Card Qualifier, where he lost in last 12 to Matthew Edgar.

In 2019 Usher participated in 2019 World Masters, where he reached the quarter-finals and lost 2–4 by sets to Mario Vandenbogaerde.

In 2020, 2021 and 2022 consequently, he took his part in PDC Q-School three times, but failed to get a Tour Card. In these years he played in UK Challenge Tour; his biggest achievement there was in July 2022 on Challenge Tour 11 and in September 2022 on Challenge Tour 18, where he reached the semi-finals on both occasions, losing to Jelle Klaasen 4–5 and Patrick Peters 3–5 respectively.

In 2022 he player in MODUS Super Series, where he hit a nine-dart leg in July in a match against Dan Read. He was defeated by Conan Whitehead in the October 2022 MODUS Super Series. 

Usher qualified for a PDC tour card for the first time at the 2023 Q-School, defeating Adam Warner on the second finals day.

Personal life
Apart from darts, Usher works for the NHS. His son Joe is also a darts player.

Performance timeline 

PDC European Tour

External links
 Graham Usher's profile and stats on Darts Database
 Graham Usher - Mastercaller
 Official Twitter Account

References

Living people
English darts players
Professional Darts Corporation players
Professional Darts Corporation current tour card holders
1973 births